This is a list of episodes of the fourteenth season of The Ellen DeGeneres Show, which began airing from Tuesday, September 6, 2016.

Episodes

External links
 

14
2016 American television seasons
2017 American television seasons